Independence Square is a square in Ashgabat, Turkmenistan. The identification number of the square is 2000.

Development
By June 2009, the square was renovated, with new fountains, original lamps and benches, being built over the course of six months. In October 2014, President Gurbanguly Berdimuhamedov acquainted with the progress of landscaping on the square, taking a bike ride through the central part of the square.

In September 2021, in honor of the 30th anniversary of Turkmen independence, the largest flat screen tv Central Asia was placed on the government tribune. It coincided with the complete renovation of the government tribune.

On September 16, a new complex of the State Tribune was opened, built on Kopetdag Avenue in the south of Ashgabat. The former tribune in Independence Square will be reconstructed and renamed into the Business Reception Center of the Oguzkhan Presidential Palace.

Events
The annual Turkmen Independence Day Parade, as well as welcome ceremony for foreign dignitaries visiting Ashgabat are held on the square. Festivities on New Year's Eve occurs on the square. In 2004, Turkmen leader Saparmurat Niyazov ordered that an original fountain be built on the square. In May 2007, a "Star Show" took place on the square dedicated to the Day of Workers of Culture and Arts and the poetry of Magtymguly Fragi, with three powerful telescopes being installed on the central square for people to look into the lens.

Landmarks
Oguzhan Presidential Palace
Ruhyyet Palace
Ministry of Defense headquarters 
Mejlis of Turkmenistan

Center of the Social Organizations of Turkmenistan
Turkmen State Library
Ministry of Textile Industry
National Olympic Committee of Turkmenistan
Ashgabat Olympic Swimming Pool
State Puppet Theatre
Saparmurar Turkmenbashi Military Academy
Pushkin Russian-Turkmen Secondary School
Foreign Economic Relations' State Bank
Embassy of the Kazakhstan
Embassy of China

Gallery

See also
Ashgabat
List of city squares

References

National squares
Squares in Ashgabat